Julio Barbero Gonzalez (born 2 September 1970) is a Spanish professional darts player who currently plays in Professional Darts Corporation (PDC) events.

Career
In 2008, Barbero won the Spanish Federation Cup by beating Antonio Alcinas. His first PDC premier event was the 2009 German Darts Championship where he lost 6–2 to Mervyn King in the third round.
Barbero came within a game of reaching the 2010 PDC World Championship, but was defeated 6–2 by Francisco Ruiz in the final of the Spanish Qualifier.

Barbero qualified for the 2014 PDC World Championship after winning the Western European qualifier, beating Gibraltar's Dylan Duo in the final. Barbero beat Germany's Andree Welge 4–1 in the preliminary round before losing 3–1 in a credible performance against England's Andy Hamilton. He came close to playing in the 2016 event, but was knocked out in the semi-finals of the South European Qualifier 6–3 by John Michael. Barbero won the 2016 Alcalas Open Darts and the Spanish Federation Cup as well as losing to Michael in the semi-finals of the World Championship qualifier for the second successive year.

World Championship results

PDC
 2014: First round (lost to Andy Hamilton 1–3) (sets)

References

Spanish darts players
1970 births
Living people
People from Cuenca, Spain
Sportspeople from the Province of Cuenca
Professional Darts Corporation former pro tour players